The New York State Department of Taxation and Finance (NYSDTF) is the department of the New York state government responsible for taxation and revenue, including handling all tax forms and publications, and dispersing tax revenue to other agencies and counties within New York State. The department also has a law enforcement division, the New York State Office of Tax Enforcement. Its regulations are compiled in title 20 of the New York Codes, Rules and Regulations.

It is headquartered in Building 8/8A at the W. Averell Harriman State Office Building Campus in Albany.

During the September 11 attacks, the department had offices on the 86th and 87th floors of the World Trade Center's South Tower. On the 86th floor, five of eight employees in the revenue crimes bureau died. On the 87th floor, the mediation services bureau lost six of seven employees. Of the estimated 20 people on the 87th floor, nine were lost, including two of three senior staff.

The tax department was formally created on January 1, 1927, but the first signs of the department date to 1859. The original intent was to find a way (a mathematical formula) to distribute tax revenue to individual counties in New York State.

See also
 New York State Office of Tax Enforcement
 New York City Department of Finance

References

External links
NYSDTF Homepage
Department of Taxation and Finance in the New York Codes, Rules and Regulations

Taxation and Finance
Taxation in New York (state)
US state tax agencies
1927 establishments in New York (state)
Government agencies established in 1927